Broderick Adé Hogue (March 22, 1989 – October 29, 2021) was a Chicago-based art director, designer, and letterer.

Early life and education 
Hogue was born on March 22, 1989 in Halifax, Virginia. He attended the University of North Carolina at Charlotte (UNCC), starting as an engineering major. After "stumbling" into a drawing class, he fell in love with art and eventually graduated with a BFA in Graphic Design in 2012. He was named as the 2018 Distinguished Alumnus in the Department of Art & Art History at UNCC.

Career 
Hogue moved to Chicago after earning his BFA. In 2013 he started a daily lettering project that eventually led to career as a freelance letterer. In 2017, he was recognized in Print (magazine)'s 15 Artists Under 30 issue.

Hogue worked for major clients including Nike, Target, Netflix, Under Armour, ESPN, and Alaska Airlines. He spoke about design and lettering at CreativeMornings, Adobe MAX, and a number of AIGA events. He taught lettering as an adjunct instructor at DePaul University.

In 2020, Jessica Hische approached Hogue to collaborate on the "Rise Up, Show Up, Unite" social media design campaign for the Biden/Harris Campaign. The project included contributions from artists including Lisa Congdon, Michael Bierut, Aaron Draplin, Debbie Millman, and Mike Perry.

Death 
On October 27, 2021, Hogue was riding a bike in the Near North Side of Chicago when he was struck by a van driver. He was hospitalized in intensive care and died on October 29 at Northwestern Memorial Hospital.

Legacy 
In February 2022, the Type Directors Club renamed their "Superscript" scholarship to the Adé Hogue Scholarship. The scholarship is a $5,000 award to an outstanding BIPOC student demonstrating exceptional talent and promise in the design and creation of letterforms.

References 

Wikipedia Student Program
1989 births
2021 deaths
American directors
People from Halifax, Virginia
Road incident deaths in Illinois
Cycling road incident deaths